The Campeonato Baiano 2008 is the 104th edition of the Campeonato Baiano. Vitória won the competition.

Format
First stage:

The 12 teams play in double round-robin in 22 rounds. The top 4 qualify for the Final Stage, the bottom team is relegated.

Final stage:

The 4 teams play in double round-robin in 6 rounds. The winners of Final Stage is the champions. The top 3 teams (except the clubs of Série A and Série B) qualify for the Série C.

Participating teams

Standings

* For offending the referee, Fluminense de Feira was punished with the loss of 6 points.

Final stage

Final standings

First Three Matches

Second Three Matches

References

Campeonato Baiano
Baiano